Mexico Songs is a music record chart of Mexico, published by Billboard since February 2022. It is updated every Tuesday on Billboards website. It is part of Billboard's Hits of the World chart collection, ranking the top 25 streaming songs weekly in more than 40 countries around the globe.

The charting songs are ranked based on a formula that incorporates official plays at the subscription and ad-supported levels of streaming music services such as YouTube, Spotify and Apple Music. Mexico Songs is the second Mexican music chart created by Billboard, after the defunct Mexico Airplay charts. Likewise, it was also the second chart of streaming songs in the country after Sreaming Semanal by the Asociación Mexicana de Productores de Fonogramas y Videogramas.

The first number-one song was "Lo Siento BB:/" by Tainy, Bad Bunny and Mexican singer Julieta Venegas on the issue dated May 7, 2022. The chart's current number-one song is "TQG" by Karol G and Shakira, on the week ending on March 18, 2023.

List of number-one songs

2022

2023

Song milestones

Most weeks at number one

Artists milestones

Most number-one songs

Most weeks at number-one

References

External links
 Current Mexico Songs chart
 Billboard charts



Billboard charts
2022 establishments in Mexico
Mexican record charts